The Yoruba Tennis Club is a tennis club in Onikan, Lagos Island, Lagos, Nigeria. It is the oldest indigenous social club  in Nigeria. The club started on 15 July 1926, as Orelodun Tennis Club.  At several meetings, the Club was later renamed “The Yoruba Tennis Club”. During the inaugural meeting the club's founders did not restrict its membership to those of Yoruba origin alone. but ensured that it has a wide variety of people from different walks of life.

The Yoruba Tennis Club is currently chaired by Bro. (Chief) Euzebio Babajide Damazio.

In September 2022, it marked its 96th anniversary

Founding members 
The first Chairman, Mr. V. Ade Allen, a notable social figure of his days led the Club through the early period and was the Chairman for eleven years.

 F. Ade Adeniji
 V. Ade Allen
 Y. St. Ariori
 H. M. Balogun
 L. Duro Emanuel Willie
 O. Fagbo D.
 A. Freeman
 J. A. Haastrup
 T. Haniba-Johnson
 H. S. Macaulay
 Frank O.
 Odumosu R.
 A. Randle

Notable members 

 Mobolaji Bank Anthony
 Ademola Rasaq Seriki

References

External links

Tennis clubs
Tennis in Nigeria
Sports clubs in Lagos